Henry or Heinrich of Prussia may refer to:
 Prince Henry of Prussia (1726–1802), younger brother of King Frederick the Great
 Frederick Henry Charles, Prince of Prussia (1747–1767), second son of Frederick the Great's brother, Prince Augustus William of Prussia
 Prince Henry of Prussia (1862–1929), younger brother of Emperor William II
 Prince Henry of Prussia (1900–1904), son of former